Gaskins is a hamlet on the Isle of Wight in England UK. It is on the B3330 (Carpenters Road), approximately  West of St Helens, and approximately  Northeast of Brading.

References

Hamlets on the Isle of Wight
Brading